Rodrigo Andrés Venegas Pérez (born 4 October 1988) is a Chilean football manager.

Career
After starting his career as manager of an Unión Española youth school, Venegas later worked at Academia de Fútbol de Juvenal Olmos and Universidad de Chile before being named under-17 manager of San Luis de Quillota in 2015. In 2019, he moved to Bolivia after being named Miguel Ponce's assistant at San José.

Venegas continued to work as Ponce's assistant in the following years, at Blooming and Deportes La Serena. On 28 November 2021, he returned to Blooming after being named manager, in the place of departing Hernán Meske.

Venegas led Blooming to the semifinals of the 2022 Apertura, but resigned on 10 August 2022. On 9 September, he took over Independiente Petrolero of the same league.

References

External links

1988 births
Living people
Chilean football managers
Bolivian Primera División managers
Club Blooming managers
Chilean expatriate football managers
Chilean expatriate sportspeople in Bolivia
Expatriate football managers in Bolivia
Independiente Petrolero managers